Frank Baldwin Jewett (September 5, 1879 – November 18, 1949) worked as an engineer for American Telegraph and Telephone where his work demonstrated transatlantic radio telephony using a vacuum-tube transmitter. He was also a physicist and the first president of Bell Labs.

Biography
He graduated from the Throop Institute of Technology (later the California Institute of Technology) in 1898, and received the doctoral degree in physics in 1902 from the University of Chicago (IL). Jewett was president of the American Institute of Electrical Engineers from 1922 to 1923.

The Bell Telephone Laboratories were established in 1925 with Jewett as president; he stayed until 1940. He also was chairman of the Board of Directors of Bell Laboratories from 1940 to 1944.

In 1928, the AIEE awarded him the Edison Medal "For his contributions to the art of electric communication." Jewett was president of the National Academy of Sciences from 1939 to 1947. In 1950, he was awarded the IRI Medal from the Industrial Research Institute for recognition of his role in technology leadership. He also served on the National Defense Research Committee.

Patents
, Means for analyzing and synthesizing electric waves, 1925.

Sources
IEEE History Biography of Frank B Jewett

External links

National Academy of Sciences Biographical Memoir

1879 births
1949 deaths
American physicists
University of Chicago alumni
Members of the United States National Academy of Sciences
Scientists at Bell Labs
People from Pasadena, California
IEEE Edison Medal recipients
John Fritz Medal recipients